Dean Collins (born Sol Ruddosky; May 29, 1917–June 1, 1984) was an American dancer, instructor, choreographer, and innovator of swing dance. He is often credited with bringing the Lindy Hop from New York to southern California. Collins worked in over thirty films and performed live and on television.

Biography
Collins grew up in Newark, New Jersey, and at age 13 learned to dance from his two older sisters. He participated in amateur dance contests in New Jersey. He danced at the Savoy Ballroom in Harlem, New York. In 1935, he was named Dancer of the Year by The New Yorker magazine.

Collins moved to Los Angeles in 1936. During the day he worked as a janitor at Simon's Drive-In Diner, and at night he danced at the Diana Ballroom and Casino Gardens. Worried that his Jewish name would hinder his career, he adopted the name "Dean Collins" from a wallet he found. He won his first major dance contest in California at the Palomar Ballroom with his Savoy dance style. The Savoy style of Swing was virtually unknown to Californians. The local dances of the day were the Camel Hop and Balboa, but their popularity quickly waned to Dean Collin's style of the East Coast Jitterbug. He started teaching his version of Savoy Style Lindy which lead the way for what is called West Coast Swing (today's Modern swing.) West Coast Swing later went on to become the Official State Dance of California which Dean is given credit as to inadvertently creating. To distinguish the difference between the original style and modern style of West Coast Swing, the original form is at times being called "Hollywood Style" which is hugely based on the original 'Movie style' of Dean's and others however, most the movie billings would call it 'Rock and Roll' in the 1950s. His contest-winning style was frequently spotted at the “Casino Gardens” and the “Diana Ballroom” and was quickly known throughout Los Angeles.

His career began when he was hired by RKO pictures to choreograph the dancing in Let's Make Music, a movie filmed in 1939 and released in 1940. In 1942 he appeared in the Soundies The Chool Song released March 23, 1942. He and his partner were billed "Collins and Colette", and music was recorded by Spike Jones. He danced in or choreographed nearly forty Hollywood movies, including an appearance in Hellzapoppin' (1941), “Dance Hall” (1941), “Playmates” (1941), “Buck Privates” (1941),”Ride Em’ Cowboy” (1942), “Springtime in the Rockies” (1942), “The Talk of the Town” (1942), “Always a Bridesmaid” (1943), “Kid Dynamite” (1943), “Junior Prom” (1945), and “Living It Up” (1954).

In the 1950s and 1960s, he taught swing dancing in Los Angeles. His students included Shirley Temple, Joan Crawford, Cesar Romero, Abbott and Costello, Jonathan Bixby, Sylvia Sykes, and Arthur Murray.

Collins's wife, Mary, believes that he contributed a smoothed out style that eliminated the bounce. According to jazz dance researcher Peter Loggins, Dean's style changed over decades, returning toward the end of his life to the Lindy Hop he learned in the Savoy Ballroom in the 1930s. The Collins style seen in Hollywood films was the source for what became known in the 1990s as Hollywood-style Lindy Hop.

Dean Collins and his style of Lindy Hop would help elaborate and define other styles like Houston Push, Dallas Whip, St. Louis Imperial Swing, Washington D.C. Hand Dancing, Carolina Shag, Collegiate Shag, St. Louis Shag, Balboa and Bal-Swing, Ballroom Swing, East Coast Swing, Jitterbug, Jive and Ballroom Jive. He created a version of the Shim Sham which was meant as a three-man performance and was not taught or shared. Jack Arkin and Johnny Mattox were the performers with Collins. Later, Bobby Hefner and Bart Bartolo performed it as well.

Jewel McGowan, who was called by her contemporaries the "greatest female swing dancer", was his dance partner for eleven years. She appeared with him in Buck Privates (1941) and Ride 'Em Cowboy (1942). Together, they were known as “Fred and Ginger of Lindy Hop.” In the 1960s and 1970s, they danced to all styles of music, just as long as it “Swung.”

Dean married and moved to Glendale, California where he was very active in the Swing Dance Community right up until his death in 1984. Dean Collins married his wife, Mary, who believes that he contributed a smoothed-out style that eliminated the bounce. When Mary Collins was asked if her husband was responsible for the emergence of West Coast Swing, she replied, “Dean insisted that there were only two kinds of Swing dancing – good and bad.” According to jazz dance researcher Peter Loggins, Dean's style changed over decades, returning toward the end of his life to the Lindy Hop  that he learned in the Savoy Ballroom in the 1930s. The Collins style seen in Hollywood films was the source for what became known in the 1990s as Hollywood-style Lindy Hop. Another quote from Dean Collins is “Young people in those days took their dancing very seriously. They spent much time with their partner, learned the steps, invented new ones. It was more than a hobby; it was a real passion.”

References

https://www.worldsdc.com/hall-of-fame/dean-collins/
https://www.streetswing.com/histmai2/d2collns1.htm
https://swingdancingeducation.weebly.com/people.html
https://socialdance.stanford.edu/syllabi/westcoast.htm
http://www.dynamics.org/MAUI_SWING/REVIEWS/FROM_WEB/history_b.htm

1917 births
1984 deaths
American swing dancers
American choreographers
Lindy Hop
20th-century American dancers
Janitors